INSAS or Indian Small Arms System is a family of infantry arms consisting of an assault rifle and a light machine gun (LMG). It was designed by the Armament Research and Development Establishment and manufactured by the Ordnance Factories Board at its various factories. The INSAS assault rifle was the standard infantry weapon of the Indian Armed Forces for almost three decades.

History
The development of the INSAS assault rifle began in mid-1980s, when the Indian Army released a general staff qualitative requirement for a new assault rifle to replace locally produced licensed copy of the L1A1 self-loading rifles, which the Army was using since 1961. The new assault rifle was to chamber the 5.56×45mm NATO cartridge unlike the L1A1 SLR rifle which chambered the 7.62×51mm NATO cartridge. 

After studying a number of designs, the Armament Research and Development Establishment (ARDE) in Pune undertook the task to design and develop India's first assault rifle. The development and user trials of the new rifle – INSAS was completed by 1989 and entered into service in 1990.

Originally, three variants were planned in the INSAS system, a rifle, a carbine and a squad automatic weapon (SAW) or Light machine gun (LMG). In 1997, the rifle and the LMG went into mass production. In 1998, the first INSAS rifles were displayed at the republic day parade. The introduction of the rifle was delayed due to the lack of adequate 5.56×45mm ammunition, large quantities of the same were bought from Israel Military Industries.

The first combat use of the rifle was during the Kargil War in 1999.

Design
The INSAS is primarily based on the AKM but incorporates features from other rifles. It has a chrome-plated bore. The barrel has a six-groove rifling. The basic gas operated long stroke piston and the rotating bolt are similar to the AKM/AK-47.

It has a manual gas regulator, similar to that of FN FAL, and a gas cutoff for launching grenades. The charging handle is on the left instead of on the bolt carrier, similar in operation to the HK33. The fire selector is placed on the left side of the receiver above the pistol grip, it can be set to semi–auto, three round burst and full auto. To set it to safe, the selector has to be rotated all the way up, which will block the sear and prevent the rifle from firing. It has three modes of fire – semi-automatic, three-round burst and full automatic modes. The cyclic rate averages at 650 rpm. It has transparent magazine much like that of Steyr AUG and is made of polymer. The rear sight lies on one end of the breech cover and is calibrated to 400 meters. 

The furniture is either made of wood or polymer. The polymer butt and forend assemblies differ from the AKM and are more similar to that of IMI Galil. Some variants have a folding butt. A bayonet can also be attached to it. 

The guns take 20- or 30-round polymer magazines. The 30-round magazine is made for the LMG version, but can be also used in the rifle. The flash suppressor also accepts NATO-specification rifle grenades.

Performance
The INSAS assault rifle was battle tested in the 1999 Kargil War. The three month long war was fought in the high altitudes of the Himalayas, where temperature would go as low as –20 degree Celsius. During the conflict the rifle encountered some problems such as occasional often serious stoppage, cracking of polymer magazine due to the cold weather and some other reliability issues such as firing in full auto when set for 3 shot burst. Similar complaints were also received from the Nepalese Army. In the Kargil war neither the INSAS proved reliable nor the Army was satisfied with the new rifle. Also the Army which was used to the 7.62×51mm NATO round for almost three decades, was dissatisfied with the stopping power of the new 5.56×45mm NATO rounds. In 2001, an improved variant of the rifle was introduced taking the feedback of the Indian Army. The new variant of the rifle was called INSAS–1B1. 

The INSAS rifle saw limited use in the Indian Army's counter-insurgency operations in Jammu and Kashmir, but was extensively used by Central Armed Police Forces in combating Maoist insurgency.

Currently the INSAS assault rifles are being replaced in the army with the AK-203 assault rifles and the SIG 716i designated marksman rifles. The LMG variant of INSAS is being replaced with the IWI Negev. However these rifles will remain in service with the police and other paramilitary forces and are being used as a replacement for the decades old bolt action Ishapore 2A1 rifles.

Variants

INSAS Standard Rifle
It is a gas operated assault rifle. It can be fired in single round or three-round burst mode. A telescopic sight or a passive night sight can be mounted on it. It can take NATO-standard 5.56×45mm SS109 and M193 ammunition. It comes with a bayonet. It has a mount point for the ARDE 40 mm under barrel grenade launcher, along with a gas-block for launching grenades and grenade iron-sights. The flash suppressor has a blank-firing adaptor. It also has a foldable butt version.

An INSAS assault rifle with black furniture, incorporating full-auto mode was introduced later. The automatic assault rifle has the same range of 400 m as the semi-automatic standard INSAS rifle.

LMG

The LMG (Light Machine Gun) differs from the standard rifle in possessing a longer range of 700 m, as compared to 400 m range of INSAS standard and assault rifles. It has a longer and heavier barrel with revised rifling, and a bipod. The LMG version uses 30-round magazines and can also accept the 20-round INSAS AR magazine. This model fires in semi and full-auto. It also has a foldable-butt version.

The LMG will be replaced with the IWI Negev Ng7.

Excalibur

The Excalibur, with a range of 400 m, can be used for battlefield engagements as well as for close combat. It is lighter and shorter as compared to the automatic INSAS assault rifle. In July 2015, it was reported that the INSAS may be replaced by the Modified INSAS rifle (MIR), which is based on the Excalibur variant. The decision was taken by General Dalbir Singh, who wanted an indigenous rifle. The prototype had two stoppages after firing 24,000 rounds, which was very close the army's specification of one stoppage. It was also reported that another prototype of Excalibur, AR-2, was being prepared which would fire 7.62×39mm rounds of the AK-47.

The prototype incorporates a direct gas-tapping angle to reduce the recoil. The rifle would have automatic and single shot modes. The three-round burst mode of the INSAS has been dropped. The rifle would have a folding butt and a standard Picatinny rail. By September 2015, it had passed the water and mud tests, which four of the foreign rifles in the tender competition had failed. It was also reported 200 rifles were being manufactured and that prototype would undergo formal trials in late 2015.

Kalantak and Amogh
The Kalantak micro assault rifle, with a range of 300 m, is for close combat and personnel defence weapon roles.

The Amogh carbine, with a range of 200 m, is specially designed for close quarter battle roles.

Bullpup
Lieutenant Colonel Prasad Bansod, of Army School Mhow reverse engineered an INSAS rifle to produce a bullpup carbine variant. He reportedly did this in his spare time. The rifle was only made as a prototype example.

Operators

 : Assault rifle and LMG variants have been adopted. 
Indian Armed Forces, to be replaced by 670,000 AK-203 rifles and 72,400 SIG-716i Patrol rifles as per the latest contract. INSAS LMGs using 5.56*45mm to be replaced by IWI Negev NG5, and the ones using 7.62*51mm will be replaced by the IWI Negev NG7 as per latest contract for 16,479 NG7s.
 Indian Paramilitary Forces
 Central Armed Police Forces
 State Police Services

: Used by the Royal Bhutan Army.
: The Nepalese Army had received about 26,000 rifles since 2001, supplied at a 70% subsidy by India. As of July 20, 2020, the Nepali Army transferred 600 INSAS rifles to the Nepali Armed Police Force.
: In 2010, the Royal Army of Oman started using the INSAS rifles sent to them as per a defence agreement signed in 2003 between India and Oman.

References

External links

 
 
 
 
 
 
 
 
 
 

5.56×45mm NATO assault rifles
Defence Research and Development Organisation
Light machine guns
Machine guns of India
Rifles of India
Weapons and ammunition introduced in 1998
Kalashnikov derivatives